The Pocahontas Federal Savings and Loan is a historic commercial building at 201 West Broadway Street in Pocahontas, Arkansas.  It is a roughly rectangular two-story building, with brick walls and a flat roof covered with tar and gravel.  It was built in 1960 to a design by Reed & Willis of Pine Bluff, Arkansas, and is a prominent local example of Mid-Century Modern design. The Pocahontas Federal Savings and Loan, for whom it was built, was established in 1910.

The building was listed on the National Register of Historic Places in 2019.

See also
National Register of Historic Places listings in Randolph County, Arkansas

References

Commercial buildings on the National Register of Historic Places in Arkansas
National Register of Historic Places in Randolph County, Arkansas